Gubkinsky District is an administrative district (raion), one of the twenty-one in Belgorod Oblast, Russia. It is located in the north of the oblast. Its administrative center is the town of Gubkin (which is not administratively a part of the district). Population:  33,974 (2002 Census);

History
The district was established on January 12, 1965.

Administrative and municipal status
Within the framework of administrative divisions, Gubkinsky District is one of the twenty-one in the oblast. The town of Gubkin serves as its administrative center, despite being incorporated separately as a town of oblast significance—an administrative unit with the status equal to that of the districts.

As a municipal division, the territory of the district and the territory of the town of oblast significance of Gubkin are incorporated together as Gubkinsky Urban Okrug.

References

Notes

Sources

External links
Official website of Gubkinsky Urban Okrug 

Districts of Belgorod Oblast
States and territories established in 1965